American Falls is a city in and the county seat of Power County, Idaho. The population was 4,457 at the time of the 2010 census.

History
American Falls was a landmark waterfall on the Snake River, named after a party of American trappers whose boat went over the falls. The Wilson Price Hunt expedition in 1811 camped at the falls one night and the expedition of John C. Frémont was here in 1843. The Oregon Trail passed north of town, through the present-day reservoir. Power plants first sprang up at the falls in 1901. American Falls was the first town in the U.S. to be entirely relocated. It was moved in 1925 to facilitate construction of the nearby American Falls Dam. The old townsite sits at the bottom of the reservoir, northwest of the present city. A larger dam was completed in 1978, downstream from the deteriorating 1927 structure, which was later demolished.

Geography

Climate

American Falls has a semi-arid climate (Köppen BSk).

Demographics

2010 census
As of the census of 2010, there were 4,457 people, 1,474 households, and 1,104 families living in the city. The racial makeup of the city was 70.2% White, 0.4% African American, 0.9% Native American, 0.5% Asian, 0.1% Pacific Islander, 25.1% from other races, and 2.8% from two or more races. Hispanic or Latino of any race were 39.0% of the population.

There were 1,474 households, of which 44.6% had children under the age of 18 living with them, 55.9% were married couples living together, 13.0% had a female householder with no husband present, 6.0% had a male householder with no wife present, and 25.1% were non-families. 21.6% of all households were made up of individuals, and 10.3% had someone living alone who was 65 years of age or older. The average household size was 3.00 and the average family size was 3.51.

The median age in the city was 30.2 years. 33.1% of residents were under the age of 18; 10.3% were between the ages of 18 and 24; 23.5% were from 25 to 44; 21.3% were from 45 to 64; and 11.9% were 65 years of age or older. The gender makeup of the city was 50.9% male and 49.1% female.

2000 census
As of the census of 2000, there were 4,111 people, 1,429 households, and 1,063 families living in the city. The racial makeup of the city was 81.56% White, 0.15% African American, 1.00% Native American, 0.41% Asian, 0.02% Pacific Islander, 15.15% from other races, and 1.70% from two or more races. Hispanic or Latino of any race were 27.83% of the population.

There were 1,429 households, out of which 40.9% had children under the age of 18 living with them, 58.1% were married couples living together, 11.8% had a female householder with no husband present, and 25.6% were non-families. 22.6% of all households were made up of individuals, and 11.3% had someone living alone who was 65 years of age or older. The average household size was 2.84 and the average family size was 3.34.

In the city, the population was spread out, with 33.7% under the age of 18, 8.9% from 18 to 24, 24.8% from 25 to 44, 20.3% from 45 to 64, and 12.2% who were 65 years of age or older. The median age was 30 years. For every 100 females, there were 95.6 males. For every 100 females age 18 and over, there were 92.0 males.

The median income for a household in the city was $30,955, and the median income for a family was $35,435. Males had a median income of $27,317 versus $21,209 for females. The per capita income for the city was $12,891. About 12.7% of families and 17.3% of the population were below the poverty line, including 19.0% of those under age 18 and 16.3% of those age 65 or over.

Education
American Falls High School is a secondary school in American Falls. In 2012, it was designated as a four star school.

In 2004, Randy Jensen, Principal of William Thomas Middle School in American Falls, was awarded the National Principal of Secondary Schools Award.

Notable residents 

 D. W. Davis, 12th governor of Idaho
 Boyd Grant, college basketball coach
 Steve Hayes, basketball player and coach
 María Sánchez, American-born Mexican footballer
 Marion Barton Skaggs, businessman 
 Annalee Skarin, writer of Mormon literature

References

External links

 American Falls is on the Tour of Idaho 
 American Falls information including photos

Cities in Idaho
Cities in Power County, Idaho
County seats in Idaho
Pocatello, Idaho metropolitan area